Pervomayskoye is a rural locality (a selo) in Ufimsky Selsoviet, Khaybullinsky District, Bashkortostan, Russia. The population was 360 as of 2010. There are 5 streets.

Geography 
Pervomayskoye is located 59 km north of Akyar (the district's administrative centre) by road. 1-ye Murzino is the nearest rural locality.

References 

Rural localities in Khaybullinsky District